"Snap" is a song by Armenian singer Rosa Linn, released on 19 March 2022. The song was written and composed by Linn, with Larzz Principato, Allie Crystal, Kinetics, Courtney Harrell, and Tamar Kaprelian. The song represented Armenia in the Eurovision Song Contest 2022 in Turin, Italy.

At Eurovision, Rosa Linn became the first artist to qualify for the final for Armenia since 2017, finishing in 20th place with 61 points. Following the contest, the song went viral on video sharing service TikTok. "Snap" reached the top of the charts in the Flanders region of Belgium, and the top ten in Germany, Austria, Netherlands, Ireland, Italy, Norway, Sweden and Switzerland. The song also reached the charts in 23 other music markets, including peaking at number 21 on the UK Singles Chart, making Rosa Linn the highest-charting foreign act from Eurovision 2022 in the UK. It also debuted on the US Billboard Hot 100 at number 97 and later peaked at number 67, becoming the second Eurovision song of the 21st century to enter the chart.

Background and release 
"Snap” was officially released on 19 March 2022, but a snippet of the song was leaked a week earlier. It was co-written by Rosa Linn with Larzz Principato, Courtney Harrell, Allie Crystal and Tamar Kaprelian, with production handled by Alex Salibian, Ethan Schneiderman, Larzz Principato, Ben Samama, and Lilith Navasardyan. The writing sessions for "Snap" took place in-between Los Angeles and Yerevan.

In an interview for Wiwibloggs, Rosa Linn stated that this song is a personal story everyone can relate to: "I think we've all been at a snapping point, where it felt like there's no way out and that the entire world is just crumbling down around you. You start questioning everything, including yourself. I have been there. And what I realized was that I had the strength to shape my reality – it just took getting out of my own way and finding inner-peace. It's all about self-love and accepting that you are enough. Writing 'Snap' was a form of therapy for me and I hope that it can be that for others who are also going through hard times."

Music video 
The music video for "Snap", filmed in Yerevan and directed by Aramayis Hayrapetyan, was released on 19 March 2022. Hayrapetyan stated that "[o]nce I heard “Snap”, I kept thinking that I had to show the artist's emotions as comprehensibly and correctly as possible. Not leaving the artist in the background was an important precondition for me. We made the video for the purpose of giving the viewers a chance to travel to another, extraordinary reality through artistic and visual solutions".

A second music video, filmed in the United States and directed by Dano Cerny, was released on 7 October 2022.

Eurovision Song Contest

Selection 
Armenia used an internal selection to determine its entry. The candidates rumoured to be in the running were Athena Manoukian, Saro Gevorgyan, Kamil Show and Rosa Linn. On 15 February 2022, AMPTV dismissed claims that Rosa Linn had already been selected, stating that no decision had been made yet and that an announcement would come in March. On 4 March, it was reported in several Armenian media outlets that two singers were in the running to represent Armenia: Rosa Linn and Saro Gevorgyan.

Rosa Linn was announced as the chosen entrant on 11 March 2022, with her entry "Snap" released on 19 March.

At Eurovision 
According to Eurovision rules, all nations with the exceptions of the host country and the "Big Five" (France, Germany, Italy, Spain and the United Kingdom) are required to qualify from one of two semi-finals in order to compete for the final; the top ten countries from each semi-final progress to the final. The European Broadcasting Union (EBU) split up the competing countries into six different pots based on voting patterns from previous contests, with countries with favourable voting histories put into the same pot. On 25 January 2022, an allocation draw was held which placed each country into one of the two semi-finals, as well as which half of the show they would perform in. Armenia was placed into the first semi-final, held on 10 May 2022, and performed in the second half of the show. Armenia qualified for the final for the first time since 2017, and eventually placed 20th with 61 points.

Commercial performance 
A few months after Eurovision, "Snap" went viral on video sharing service TikTok, leading to an increase of streams on Spotify and topping the daily viral charts in various countries. "Snap" started entering numerous countries' national charts, surpassing the Ukrainian winning song, "Stefania" by Kalush Orchestra, for the most chart entries by a Eurovision song from 2022.

So far, the song has reached the top of the chart in the Flanders region of Belgium and the top ten in Austria, Netherlands, Ireland, Italy, Norway, Sweden and Switzerland. In the United Kingdom, the song peaked at number 21 on the UK Singles Chart, making Rosa Linn the highest-charting foreign act from Eurovision 2022 in the UK. "Snap" debuted on the US Billboard Hot 100 at number 97, later peaking at number 67, and spent four weeks at number 1 on the Adult Alternative Airplay chart.

In popular culture
In 2023, the song was played during an episode of the first season of Shrinking.

Awards and nominations

Charts

Weekly charts

Monthly charts

Year-end charts

Certifications

Release history

References 

2022 songs
2022 singles
Eurovision songs of Armenia
Eurovision songs of 2022
Songs written by Courtney Harrell
Ultratop 50 Singles (Flanders) number-one singles
Ultratop 50 Singles (Wallonia) number-one singles